Celebrity Deathmatch is the soundtrack to the MTV American stop-motion animated television series Celebrity Deathmatch. Released on November 2, 1999 by Interscope Records, the soundtrack consisted of a blend of alternative rock and hip hop. The soundtrack featured Marilyn Manson's Grammy-nominated single "Astonishing Panorama of the Endtimes".

Track listing

References

Celebrity Deathmatch
Hip hop soundtracks
1999 soundtrack albums
Television animation soundtracks
Interscope Records soundtracks
Alternative rock soundtracks